Max Payne (born 11 September 1940) is a British former racing driver.

Payne drove in the World Sports-Prototype Championship from 1982 to 1988, primarily for Ark Racing driving a Cosworth powered Ceekar chassis.

References

1940 births
Living people
British racing drivers
World Sportscar Championship drivers